This article lists the individuals who have served as governor of Oregon from the establishment of the Provisional Government between 1841 and 1843 to the present day.

Governors

Champoeg Meetings
The Champoeg Meetings, including a constitutional committee, held from February 1841 until May 1843, served as a de facto government before the government was officially established. While early attempts at establishing a government had been unsuccessful because of discontent between English American and French Canadian settlers over the question, whom they should choose as governor, several other officers were elected at these meetings, including the position of Supreme Judge as the highest position at the second meeting. For lack of a government the Supreme Judge also received executive and legislative duties and was mostly chosen as the chairman of the following meetings.

Provisional Government
The meetings at Champoeg led up to the first constitution of the Oregon Country and several petitions for U.S. territorial status. The resulting acts also created this body as a provisional government for the region. The first executives of this government were a three-person, elected committee known as the executive committee. In 1845, elections for a chief executive were held. The first person in Oregon to hold the title of governor was George Abernethy, a prominent businessman.

Governors of the Territory of Oregon

Oregon became a U.S. Territory in 1848. Like most other U.S. territorial governments, Oregon's territorial governor was appointed by the President of the United States. As transportation and communications were not as reliable or as fast as 21st-century methods, there were times when a departing governor left office and a new governor could not yet take over. This resulted in several local individuals acting as territorial governor until the new executive was appointed and arrived to take office.

President Polk initially appointed Brigadier General James Shields to be Oregon's first territorial governor and Shields was confirmed by the Senate, but he declined the position and Joseph Lane was appointed in his place.

Governors of the State of Oregon

See also 
 Governorship of John Kitzhaber
 Governorship of Kate Brown

Notes

References

General

 
 

Constitution

 
 

Specific

External links

Office of the Governor of Oregon

Lists of state governors of the United States
 
Governors